Pechenga (Finnish and ; ;) is an urban locality (an urban-type settlement) in Pechengsky District, Murmansk Oblast, Russia.  Municipally, it is incorporated as Pechenga Urban Settlement of Pechengsky Municipal District. Population:

History
The Pechenga area has been indigenously inhabited by the Finnic Kvens and the Sami. 

The settlement was founded by Russians  as the Pechenga Monastery in 1533 at the influx of the Pechenga River into the Barents Sea, 135 km west of modern Murmansk. St. Tryphon of Pechenga, a monk from Novgorod is considered to be  the founder of Pechenga Monastery. In 1533, the area became part of Russia. 

Inspired by the model of the Solovki, Tryphon wished to convert the local Sami population to Christianity and to demonstrate how faith could flourish in the most inhospitable lands. His example was eagerly followed by other Russian monks. By 1572, the Pechenga Monastery counted about 50 brethren and 200 lay followers. Six years after Tryphon's death in 1583, the wooden monastery was raided and burnt down by the Swedes. It is said that the raid claimed the lives of 51 monks and 65 lay brothers. The monastery was moved closer to the Norwegian border. It was destroyed in 1764, but restored in 1880, and exists to this day.

During the state of war between Finland and Soviet Russia (1918–1920) the area around Pechenga was occupied by the Finnish forces, and as a result of the Treaty of Tartu in 1920 became a part of Finland as Petsamo. Nickel was discovered in 1921 and began to be exploited commercially in 1935. The area was captured by the Soviets during the Winter War in 1940 but returned to Finland at the conclusion of the war. During the Second World War, between 1941 through 1944, Petsamo was used as a staging post for attacks on Murmansk by Finland and Germany. Aircraft from the British aircraft carrier  attacked the port on July 30, 1941. The area was captured by the Red Army during the Petsamo–Kirkenes Offensive in 1944 and in 1947, after the subsequent Paris Peace Treaty, incorporated into the Soviet Union.

After the war the area was a military zone due to its proximity to the Norwegian border. Nickel mining has led to ecological problems in the area.

The 200th Independent Motor Rifle Brigade is stationed at the settlement.

References

External links
Skolt Sámi History
Website of Pechengsky District

Urban-type settlements in Murmansk Oblast
Barents Sea
Geographic history of Finland
Populated places established in 1533